NHRA Drag Racing is a 1998 video game from Mind Magic Productions. The game was sanctioned by the National Hot Rod Association

Reception

Hyper gave the game a score of 64 out of 100, stating: "Drag racing fans probably wouldn't be disappointed and would probably boost the gameplay mark, but a racing title without handling will wear thin fast with any other gamers"

References

1998 video games
Racing video games